160 Tooley Street is a municipal facility in Tooley Street, Southwark, London. It is the headquarters of Southwark London Borough Council.

History
The proposed development combined the refurbishment of some Victorian warehouses with the construction of a modern six-storey office block behind the warehouses. The site was assembled by the developer, Great Portland Estates, at a cost of £19 million in 2004 and the building was forward sold to UBS Global Asset Management for £94 million, before works started, in June 2006.

The new facility was designed by Allford Hall Monaghan Morris, built by Laing O'Rourke at a cost of £42 million and completed in June 2008. The developer had specified that at least 10% of the building's power requirement should be capable of being met from renewable energy.

Southwark London Borough Council, which had previously been based at the ageing Camberwell Town Hall, moved into the completed building, which measured , as rental tenants in March 2009. The council acquired the freehold ownership of the building from UBS for £170 million in December 2012. It continues to be the administrative headquarters and meeting place of Southwark London Borough Council and some 2,000 council staff are based in the complex. Memorials to council staff who had died in the First and Second World Wars, which had been recovered from Camberwell Town Hall, were rededicated by the Bishop of Southwark, Christopher Chessun, at Tooley Street in March 2013.

Notes

References

Buildings and structures in the London Borough of Southwark
City and town halls in London
Government buildings completed in 2008